The 2011 Marrakesh bombing was a domestic terrorist bombing of the Argana Cafe in Jemaa el-Fnaa, Marrakesh, Morocco, on April 28, 2011. A lone terrorist, Adil El-Atmani, planted two homemade pressure cooker bombs hidden inside of a backpack at the cafe and detonated them at 11:50 a.m., killing 17 and injuring 25. Many of the dead were tourists, including a group of French students.

El-Atmani, a 25 year-old shoe salesman, pledged allegiance to Al-Qaeda in the Islamic Maghreb, who denied involvement in the attack. He was arrested six days later after a SIM card registered under his name was found in what remained of the bomb. During questioning, he said that he learned bomb-making on the Internet. A letter to the French government found on his laptop ordered the withdrawal of French troops in the Middle East, threatening to "attack targets in the heart of France" if his order was not fulfilled within the twenty days following the attack.

Adil El-Atmani was sentenced to death for the attack by an anti-terrorism court in Salé. He is awaiting execution at Moul El Bergui central prison in Safi. He was put in solitary confinement in 2017 after attempting to kill his cellmate.

Casualties
17 people were killed, of which fourteen died on the site, while three more succumbed to their injuries the next day. 25 people were injured, four seriously, including Russian computer hacker Roman Seleznev, a portion of whose skull was blown off.

The casualties were eight French nationals, including a girl of 10 years, originally from northern France, an Israeli-Canadian woman and her Moroccan husband, another Moroccan citizen, a Briton (Peter Moss, 59, from London who was a former writer for the newspaper The Jewish Chronicle), a Dutchman, a Swiss and a Portuguese. The Swiss and the Portuguese were the companions of two Ticino natives injured in the same attack.

Among the injured, 14 were hospitalised and four were repatriated to their country the next day (two Swiss and two Russians), while others left the hospital after receiving the necessary care. One of the Swiss later died while in hospital in Zurich.

Responsibility
Morocco blamed Al Qaeda in the Islamic Maghreb for the bombing. The group has been fighting an insurgent campaign since 2002. However, Al Qaeda denied responsibility for the blast.

On 28 October 2011, in court in Rabat, Adel al-Othmani was sentenced to death for his role in the bombing.

Hakim Dah received a life sentence. Four others were given four years and three were given a two-year sentence for their roles. The defendants complained that the case against them was based on confessions coerced through torture and lacked hard evidence.

International reactions
 – President Serzh Sargsyan sent his condolences to the King of Morocco and stated his support "in finding the culprits and bringing them to justice".

 issued a strong condemnation of the blasts; French president Nicolas Sarkozy describing them as "cruel and cowardly". Alain Juppé, the French foreign minister, denounced what it considered to be a "barbaric terrorist attack that nothing can justify", calling for "all light to be shed on this revolting crime, for those responsible to be found, tried and punished".

 urged that the attack "must not stop the reform process that has been initiated in Morocco", referring to the ongoing "Arab Spring".

 Secretary of State Hillary Clinton said that "the United States condemns in the strongest terms today's terrorist attack that killed and injured innocent people at a cafe in Marrakesh, Morocco. We extend our deepest sympathies to the victims of this cowardly attack and stand with the people of Morocco at this difficult time."

References 

Attacks in Africa in 2011
Mass murder in 2011
Terrorist incidents in Morocco in 2011
21st century in Marrakesh
Improvised explosive device bombings in Africa
Islamic terrorist incidents in 2011
Explosions in Morocco
Building bombings in Africa
2011 disasters in Morocco
2011 in Morocco
Attacks on tourists
Massacres in Morocco